Fissurella oriens is a species of sea snail, a marine gastropod mollusk in the family Fissurellidae, the keyhole limpets.

There are two subspecies known : 
 Fissurella oriens fulvescens G.B. Sowerby I, 1835 : found in the Pacific Ocean along Chile.
 Fissurella oriens oriens G.B. Sowerby I, 1834 : the Rising Sun Keyhole Limpet; found along the Falkland Islands and Isla Chiloé, Chile (represented as Fissurella oriens G. B. Sowerby I, 1834)

Description
The size of an adult shell varies between 30 mm and 70 mm.

Distribution
Pacific Ocean along Chile.

References

 Ramírez-Böhme [= Ramírez Boehme] J. (1974) Nuevas especies chilenas de Lucapina, Fissurella y Collisella (Mollusca, Archaeogastropoda). Boletin, Museo Nacional de Historia Natural [Santiago de Chile] 33: 15-34.

External links
 Sowerby, G. B., I; Sowerby, G. B., II. (1832-1841). The conchological illustrations or, Coloured figures of all the hitherto unfigured recent shells. London, privately published.
 Sowerby, G. B., I; Sowerby, G. B., II. (1832-1841). The conchological illustrations or, Coloured figures of all the hitherto unfigured recent shells. London, privately published
 Philippi, [R. A. (1845). Diagnosen einiger neuen Conchylien. Archiv für Naturgeschichte. 11: 50-71]
  Petit, R. E. (2009). George Brettingham Sowerby, I, II & III: their conchological publications and molluscan taxa. Zootaxa. 2189: 1–218
  McLean J.H. (1984) Systematics of Fissurella in the Peruvian and Magellanic faunal provinces (Gastropoda: Prosobranchia). Contributions in Science, Natural History Museum of Los Angeles County 354: 1–70, p. 49. (29 October 1984) 
 

Fissurellidae
Gastropods described in 1834